58th edition of the tournament. Kuwait SC are the defending champions.

Teams

League table

Statistics

Top scorers

Best player in the season
 Ahmed Al-Dhefiri

References

External links
 
Kuwait League Fixtures and Results at FIFA
Kuwaiti League 

Kuwait Premier League seasons
Premier League
Kuwaiti Premier League